Let Us Garlands Bring is a song cycle for baritone and piano composed by Gerald Finzi between 1929 and 1942, and published as his Op. 18. It consists of five settings of songs from plays by William Shakespeare. It was premiered on 12 October 1942 at a National Gallery lunchtime concert in London. That day was the 70th birthday of Ralph Vaughan Williams, and the cycle is dedicated to him. Finzi subsequently arranged the work for baritone and string orchestra.

A typical performance lasts about 15 minutes. The songs, with their sources, are:
 "Come Away, Come Away, Death" (Twelfth Night, Act II, Scene 4)
 "Who Is Silvia?" (The Two Gentlemen of Verona, Act IV, Scene 2)
 "Fear No More the Heat o' the Sun" (Cymbeline, Act IV, Scene 2)
 "O Mistress Mine" (Twelfth Night, Act II, Scene 3)
 "It Was a Lover and His Lass" (As You Like It, Act V, Scene 3)

The title of the cycle is the last line of "Who Is Silvia?".

Recordings
1995: Bryn Terfel, Malcolm Martineau, on The Vagabond, Deutsche Grammophon
2001: Janet Baker, Geoffrey Parsons, on Baker, BBC
2005: Teddy Tahu Rhodes, Sharolyn Kimmorley, on Vagabond, ABC Classics
2005: Roderick Williams, Iain Burnside, on I Said To Love, Naxos (company)
2016: Ian Bostridge, Antonio Pappano, on Shakespeare Songs, Warner Classics

References

External links 

Song cycles by Gerald Finzi
Classical song cycles in English
1942 compositions
Music based on works by William Shakespeare
Music with dedications